The following is a list of Israeli artists working in visual or plastic media.

A 

 Abed Abdi
 Larry Abramson
 Matanya Abramson
 Yaacov Agam
 Mel Alexenberg
 Dan Allon
 Oz Almog
 Nir Alon
 Ella Amitay Sadovsky
 Aharon April
 Amnon David Ar
 Boaz Arad
 Mordecai Ardon
 Einat Arif-Galanti
 Avigdor Arikha
 David Ascalon
 Maurice Ascalon
 Isidor Ascheim
 Oreet Ashery
 Maya Attoun
 Mordechai Avniel
Nehemia Azaz

B 

 Samuel Bak
Adina Bar-On
 Tuvia Beeri
 Edward Ben Avram
 Avner Ben-Gal
 Yosl Bergner
 Helen Berman
 Naftali Bezem
 Alexander Bogen
 Beverly Barkat

C 

 Rhea Carmi
Zoya Cherkassky-Nnadi
 Pinchas Cohen-Gan
 Maya Cohen-Levy
 Keren Cytter

D 

 Yitzhak Danziger
 Ya'acov Dorchin

E 

 Bracha L. Ettinger

F 

 Belu-Simion Fainaru
 Dov Feigin
 Yitzhak Frenkel

G 

 Pinchas Cohen Gan
 Ilan Garibi
 Gideon Gechtman
 Mordechai Geldman
 David Gerstein
 Michail Grobman
 Batia Grossbard 
 Dor Guez
 Nachum Gutman

H 

 Shlomit Haber-Schaim 
 Paul Hartal
 Emanuel Hatzofe
 Michal Heiman
 Itshak Holtz
 Shimshon Holzman

I 

 Eli Ilan

J 

 Marcel Janco

K 

 Menashe Kadishman
 Leo Kahn
 Dani Karavan
 Shemuel Katz
 Joseph Kossonogi
 Elyasaf Kowner
 Heddy Kun

L 

 Jeremy Langford
 Raffi Lavie
 Maya Cohen Levy
 Pamela Levy

M 

 Zvi Malnovitzer
 Emmanuel Mané-Katz
 Leonid Mezheritski
 Grégoire Michonze
 Nachume Miller
 Motti Mizrachi
 David Mezach

N 

 Adi Nes
 Joshua Neustein
 Lea Nikel

O 

 Avraham Ofek
 Aliza Olmert
 Ezra Orion
 Chana Orloff
 Batya Ouziel

P 

 Felice Pazner Malkin
 Abel Pann
 Meir Pichhadze
 Jacob Pins
 Sam Philipe
 Raphael Perez

R 

 Ze'ev Raban
 Ilana Raviv
 Nissan Rilov
 Hillel Roman
 Leo Roth
 Michal Rovner
 Reuven Rubin
 Zahara Rubin
 Joram Rozov

S 

 Moshe Safdie
 Naomi Safran-Hon
 Zahara Schatz
 Buky Schwartz
 Shlomo Selinger
 Hagit Shahal
 Gabriel and Maxim Shamir
 Shaul Shats
 Avner Sher
 Ahuva Sherman
 Siona Shimshi
 Merav Shinn Ben-Alon 
 Shlomo Shriki
 Jacob Steinhardt
 Zamy Steynovitz
 Maayan Strauss
 Yehezkel Streichman
 Sucho (Gedalia Suchowolski)
 Sari Srulovitch

T 

 Roni Taharlev 
 Tal R
 Ruben Talberg
 Itzchak Tarkay
 David Tartakover
 Paul Harrison Taylor
 Anna Ticho
 Igael (or Yigal) Tumarkin

W 

 Shraga Weil

Y 

 Yuval Yairi
 Abraham Yakin
 Hannah Yakin
 Yitzhak Yamin
 Daniela Yaniv-Richter
 Yoop de Yons
 Josephinne Yaroshevich
 Addam Yekutieli

Z 

 Idan Zareski
 Moshe Ziffer
 Julia Zisman

Jewish painters
Israeli painters
 
Israeli
Visual artists
Israeli
Israeli